Andrew Jackson Libano Jr. (January 19, 1903 – June 22, 1935) was an American sailor who competed in the 1932 Summer Olympics.

He died as result of a Streptococcal infection in New Orleans, Louisiana.

In 1932 he was a crew member of the American boat Jupiter, which won the gold medal in the Star class.

References

External links
 
 
 

1903 births
1935 deaths
American male sailors (sport)
Sailors at the 1932 Summer Olympics – Star
Olympic gold medalists for the United States in sailing
Medalists at the 1932 Summer Olympics
Deaths from streptococcus infection